Eoophyla scioxantha is a moth in the family Crambidae. It was described by Edward Meyrick in 1937. It is found in the Republic of the Congo, the Democratic Republic of the Congo, South Africa and Zambia.

The wingspan is 15–20 mm. The forewings are yellow with an antemedian fascia of grey and brown scales and brown spots on the costa. The base of the hindwings is white, but brownish centrally.

References

Eoophyla
Moths described in 1937